HD 173417 is a single star in the northern constellation of Lyra. It is dimly visible to the naked eye with an apparent visual magnitude of 5.68, positioned about two degrees to the southwest of the bright star Sheliak. The distance to this star is approximately 169 light years based on parallax measurements, and it is slowly drifting closer with a radial velocity of −3 km/s.

The stellar classification of this star is F1III-IV, matching an evolving star with the mixed luminosity traits of a subgiant and giant star. It is 1.7 billion years old with a low metallicity and a relatively high projected rotational velocity of 54 km/s. The star has 1.6 times the mass of the Sun and 2.2 times the Sun's radius. It is radiating over 10 times the luminosity of the Sun from its photosphere at an effective temperature of 6,928 K.

References

F-type giants
F-type subgiants
Lyra (constellation)
BD+31 3348
173417
091883
7044